Philipp Wasserburg (11 October 1827, Mainz - 13 April 1897, Gonsenheim) was a German Roman Catholic writer, publicist and member of the parliament of Hesse. He wrote under the pseudonym Philipp Laicus.

Selected works 
 Gedichte. Gießen 1850.
 Rosen und Dornen aus dem Leben Papst Pius IX. Kirchheim, Mainz 1868.
 Liberale Phrasen, beleuchtet. Kirchheim, Mainz 1871.
 Ringende Mächte. Ein socialer Roman aus der Gegenwart. Kirchheim, Mainz 1872.
 Silvio, ein Roman aus den Tagen von Mentana. Kirchheim, Mainz 1873.
 Zur rechten Stunde. Eine Erzählung aus dem amerikanischen Pflanzerleben. 1876.
 Wilhelm Emmanuel Freiherr von Ketteler, Bischof von Mainz. Eine kurze Lebensskizze. 2. Auflage. Kirchheim, Mainz 1877.
 Die Rose vom Wetternsee. Historischer Roman. 1880.
 Auf dunklen Pfaden zu lichten Höh'n. Geschichtlicher Roman. 1884.
 Der letzte Häuptling von Killarney. Eine historische Erzählung. 1884.
 Kreuz und Kelle. Roman aus der jüngsten Vergangenheit. Benziger, Einsiedeln 1887.
 Madonna di Tirano. Eine Veltliner Geschichte aus der Reformationszeit. 1888.
 Kreuz und Halbmond. Geschichtlicher Roman. 1889.
 Der letzte König der Gothen. Geschichtlicher Roman. 1891.
 Etwas später! Fortsetzung von Bellamy's Rückblick aus dem Jahre 2000. Kirchheim, Mainz 1891.
 Die Reichthümer der Enterbten. 1892.
 Haus Cardigan. Historische Erzählung. 1893.
 Kaiser oder Papst. Historischer Roman. 1893.
 Sonntagsheiligung – Sonntagsruhe. 1894.
 Der Niedergang der romanischen Völker. 1895.
 Die fünf Wunden Europas. 1895.
 Im blutigen Ringen. Historische Erzählung aus der Mitte des 10. Jahrhunderts. 1897.

References

External links
 
 
 Philipp Wasserburg - Rheinland-Pfälzischen Personendatenbank

History of Hesse
Politicians from Mainz
Roman Catholic writers
German male writers
Writers from Mainz
1827 births
1897 deaths